Georissa biangulata is a species of minute cave snails that have an operculum. They are gastropod mollusks in the family Hydrocenidae.

Distribution
This species is endemic to Guam.

References

Hydrocenidae
Fauna of Guam
Cave snails
Molluscs of Oceania
Gastropods described in 1894
Taxonomy articles created by Polbot